Gualdo Cattaneo is a comune (municipality) in the Province of Perugia in the Italian region Umbria, located about 25 km southeast of Perugia.

References

External links
 Portale di Gualdo Cattaneo 
Thayer's Gazetteer

Hilltowns in Umbria
Cities and towns in Umbria